Paul D. Ginsberg (born 1962) is the President of Roark Capital Group, a private equity firm based in Atlanta, Georgia. 

Previously, Ginsberg was a senior partner, co-head of the Global mergers & acquisitions group and a member of the Management Committee of Paul, Weiss, Rifkind, Wharton & Garrison LLP, the international law firm based in New York.

Biography
Ginsberg was born in 1962 in Jackson Heights, Queens and is a graduate of Stuyvesant High School (1980), Union College (B.A. with Honors, Political Science, 1984, magna cum laude, Phi Beta Kappa) and the University of Chicago Law School (1987).  He was awarded the Oswald Heck-Irwin Steingut Prize for the top student majoring in Political Science.

He is a current member of Union College's Board of Trustees, and a past member of The Visiting Committee of the University of Chicago Law School, the Yale Parents Leadership Council, and the Cornell Parents Committee.

Career 
Before becoming a private equity investor, as a lawyer, Ginsberg was regularly internationally recognized for mergers & acquisitions and private equity by Chambers USA, Legal 500, IFLR 1000, SuperLawyers and Best Lawyers in America.  He was named a 2008 "Dealmaker of the Year" by The American Lawyer magazine for his role in the acquisition by Triarc Companies, Inc. of Wendy's International, Inc. and "Dealmaker of the Week" (October 23, 2009) for his role in the acquisition of First Republic Bank by an investor group led by General Atlantic Partners.

References

1962 births
Living people
People from Jackson Heights, Queens
Stuyvesant High School alumni
University of Chicago Law School alumni
Union College (New York) alumni
American chief operating officers
Paul, Weiss, Rifkind, Wharton & Garrison people